George "Buster" Rhymes (born January 27, 1962) is a former professional American football wide receiver.

Biography
Rhymes grew up in Liberty City, an inner city neighborhood of Miami, Florida. He graduated from Miami Northwestern and the University of Oklahoma under coach Barry Switzer in 1980. He was named Dade County's Athlete of the Year for 1979–80.

Buster achieved All-American recognition at Oklahoma as a wide receiver.

Rhymes played in two National Football League (NFL) seasons for the Vikings in 1985 and 1986, and in 1985 set an NFL single-season record for kick return yardage with 1,345 yards; the league record has since been broken, but the total stood as a Vikings franchise record until broken by Cordarrelle Patterson in the final game of the 2013 season. Following his NFL stint, Rhymes went to Canada and played for the Winnipeg Blue Bombers of the Canadian Football League (CFL). He spent two seasons there (1988 and 1989), winning a Grey Cup championship ring in 1988.

In popular culture
Rhymes was the inspiration behind American rapper Busta Rhymes' stage name, which was given to him by Chuck D.

References

1962 births
Living people
African-American players of American football
American football return specialists
American football wide receivers
Minnesota Vikings players
Oklahoma Sooners football players
Winnipeg Blue Bombers players
Miami Northwestern Senior High School alumni
Players of American football from Miami
21st-century African-American people
20th-century African-American sportspeople
Players of Canadian football from Miami